My Step Brother Frankenstein is a 2004 Russian drama film directed by Valery Todorovsky.

Plot 
The film is about a man who learns that he has an adult son, who became disabled in the Chechen war. He thinks that the war is still ongoing and needs to protect a new family.

Cast 
 Leonid Yarmolnik as Yulik
 Daniil Spivakovsky as Pavlik
 Elena Yakovleva as Rita
 Artyom Shalimov as Yegor
 Marianna Ilyina as Anya
 Sergey Gazarov as Edik
 Sergey Garmash as Kurbatov
 Elvira Danilina as Galina
 Vladimir Bogdanov as Ryvzh
 Tatyana Shumova as Arina
 Sergey Yakubenko as Feliks
 Darya Belousova as Sveta

References

External links 
 

2004 films
2000s Russian-language films
Russian drama films
2004 drama films
Films directed by Valery Todorovsky